The UCSF Library is the library of the University of California, San Francisco. It is one of the world's foremost libraries in the health sciences.

Facilities
The main branch (Kalmanovitz Library) is located at the Parnassus campus, with secondary locations at the Mission Bay campus in the Rutter Center and Mission Hall. Additionally, the library is affiliated with the ZSFG Library at the Zuckerberg San Francisco General Hospital, the Fishbon Memorial Library at UCSF Medical Center, the UCSF Fresno Medical Library at UCSF Fresno Medical Education Program, the UCSF Patient Health Library at Mount Zion Medical Center, the Medical Library at Benioff Children's Hospital Oakland, and the Veterans Affairs Medical Center Library at the San Francisco VA Medical Center.

Art
The main branch hosts artwork by Hiroshige, Georges Mathieu, Helaman Ferguson, Fred Reichman, R.C. Gorman, Bill Woodrow, Robert Cremean, and Sarah Sze.

Archives and Special Collections
The UCSF Archives and Special Collections is part of the UCSF Library located on the Parnassus campus in San Francisco, California. The UCSF archives serve as the official repository for the preservation of selected records, printed and born-digital materials, and realia generated by or about UCSF, including the School of Medicine, School of Nursing, School of Pharmacy, School of Dentistry, the Graduate Division, and the UCSF Medical Center. The archives also include rare and unique materials that support research and teaching in the history of the health sciences.

The institutional archives were officially established in 1963 by UC President Clark Kerr. He mandated the creation of both a records management system and an archives program at UCSF. The medical history rare book collection began in the 1930s, before the establishment of the institutional archives.

Holdings
Significant rare book collections and archival holdings include: 
Pre-20th century works related to the health sciences published in the San Francisco Bay Area or by California authors, includes several early medical and dental journals and San Francisco Department of Public Health reports
Homeopathy archival papers and works from the library of the Hahnemann Medical College of the Pacific
Speck collection on cholera, includes pamphlets and reports on cholera epidemics in the US and Europe 
Ralph H. Kellogg collection for high-altitude physiology
Incunabula regarding the health sciences and early printed work (16th to 19th century) 
The East Asian Collection, includes works related to the history of Western medicine in Japan and pharmacy and medical schools in Japan from the middle of the 16th century to 1900
Japanese Woodblock Print Collection
HIV/AIDS epidemic material from the UCSF AIDS History Project
Tobacco Control Archives
Biotechnology Archives, including the collections of J. Michael Bishop, Choh Hao Li, the Radiologic Imaging Laboratory, and Harold Varmus
Digitized collection of UCSF university publications, yearbooks, pamphlets, and books dating from the  16th century through the 2000s accessible through HathiTrust

Industry Documents Library
The UCSF Industry Documents Library (IDL) is a digital archive of internal tobacco, drug, food, chemical, and fossil fuel corporate documents, acquired largely through litigation, which illustrate industry efforts to influence policies and regulations meant to protect public health. The mission of the UCSF Industry Documents Library is to "identify, collect, curate, preserve, and make freely accessible internal documents created by industries and their partners which have an impact on public health, for the benefit and use of researchers, clinicians, educators, students, policymakers, media, and the general public at UCSF and internationally". The collection includes the  Truth Tobacco Industry Documents and the Drug Industry Document Archive.

External links
 Official site
 Brought to Light blog
 Industry Documents Library
 Center for Tobacco Control Research and Education

References

University of California, San Francisco
Archives in the United States
University and college academic libraries in the United States
Rare book libraries in the United States
Special collections libraries in the United States
Libraries in San Francisco
Tobacco in the United States
Business and industry archives
Pharmaceutical industry
American digital libraries